Kopeysk Machine-Building plant  is Russia's largest manufacturer of Mineral processing equipment and mining equipment, situated in Kopeysk, Chelyabinsk, Russia. Its products have been sold in over 30 countries.

History
The company was founded in  under the name of State All-Union Machine-Building Plant after Sergei Kirov . The basis of this company, Gorlovka Engineering Plant in Ukraine, was evacuated as a result of Operation Barbarossa just as the Kopeysk Mine Repair Plant.
Its production started on November 28 1941 and consisted of the manufacture of goods for the needs of the war against Nazi Germany. In 1942, the company was redesigned for civilian needs; especially production of mining equipment, logging machines, pumps and fans. In 1943, the company developed  “Kopeyskaya Pulsating Power-1”, a new Coal Cutter. It was awarded the Stalin Prize as result. In 1948, it assembled the first Walking Excavator (ESH-1) in the Soviet Union. In 1950, the plant's products were exported to Poland, Bulgaria and China. In 1976 the company was decorated with an Order of the Red Banner of Labour
In the 90s, the company was reorganized into a joint stock company. Also in this period, a new machine was developed for loading potash ores and salt - K-500. From 2004 to 2010, the plant underwent a re-equipment. In 2006, the Kopeysk Machine-Building Plant was thanked by the President of the Russian Federation. In 2008, the KP21-02 roadheader and the Ural-20R roadheader were developed at the plant.  the KP21 roadheader family are modern tunneling machines and they are all equipped with Remote control to ensure safety at work roadheaders in mines prone to sudden outbursts of coal and gas.

Quality Management 
“Kopeysk Machine-Building plant” operates under the QMS. Thus it has got the ISO 9001 International Standard and TÜV  in design and production of mining equipment, communal services equipment, forging and foundry blanks for machine.

Products
The company produces mining equipment, metallurgy equipment, Underground mining equipment, and ore crushers.
Roadheader: PK-3M,  PK-10, KP330, KP220, KP220K, KP150, KP21-150, KP21, 1GPKS
Trencher: 2086.31, 2086.51, AT, ATM
Loader : 2PNB2B, MPK3, MPK3B, KALIY-4500
Mine Drilling rig: UBSH-210A
Coal Cutter: URAL-33M
Heading-and-Wining Machines: URAL-10R, URAL-20R-11, URAL-20R-12, URAL-61A, URAL-60S
Shuttle mine car: V17K

References

External links
 Official website

Manufacturing companies established in 1941